The 2011–12 season was the 20th season of competitive football in Azerbaijan.

The season began on 6 August 2011 for Premier League and 10 September for the First Division. The first round of the Premier League ended on 7 March 2012, with the Championship and Relegation groups having their first games on 11 March. The Championship group ended on 11 May 2013 and the Relegation group on 12 May 2013, the same day as the First Division ended.

Season events

Inter Baku scandal
On 21 August 2011, Inter Baku - FK Baku game was suspended during last minutes due referee scandal, therefore game's fate decided after Professional Football League of Azerbaijan's decision. On 23 August 2011, PFL awarded 3-0 technical victory to FK Baku and announced the following punishments were given to Inter Baku's individuals: 
Georgi Nikolov, club's chairman: 5 game ban from football and fined 5,000 AZN.
Kakhaber Tskhadadze: fined 1,000 AZN.
Giorgi Lomaia: 2 game ban and fined 2,000 AZN.
Furthermore, Inter Baku fined additional 13,000 AZN for breaching security regulations.

Khazar Lankaran and Turan controversy
On 6 August 2011, the Disciplinary Committee of AFFA imposed the punishment on the scandal that took place in two matches. Khazar Lankaran fined 10,000 AZN after club's fans threw alien objects to the court, injuring the head of Inter Baku's coach Kakhaber Tskhadadze. Khazar also must play its next two league home matches in an empty stadium because of its fans' aggressive behavior.

AFFA fined Turan Tovuz 26,000 AZN and moved its next two league home matches on a neutral ground for injuring referees, breaking PFL camera as well as for refusing to play at the second half of 2011–12 Azerbaijan Cup. The club's president Musa Suleymanov has been disqualified for five matches and club received technical defeat of 0-3.

National Football Team

Euro 2012 qualification

Friendlies

Goal scorers

League tables

Azerbaijan Premier League

Championship group

Relegation group

Azerbaijan First Division

Azerbaijan Cup

Managerial changes

Transfers

References